CHRZ-FM is a Canadian radio station, broadcasting at 91.3 FM in Wasauksing, Ontario near Parry Sound. Branded as Rez 91, the station airs a First Nations community radio format.

History

It is unknown when the station originally began broadcasting, however, on October 28, 2011, Wasauksing Communications Group applied to operate an English and Ojibwa language Type B native FM radio programming in Wasauksing First Nation. If approved, the station will operate at 91.3 MHz. On May 9, 2012, Wasauksing Communications received a licence from the Canadian Radio-television and Telecommunications Commission (CRTC) to operate a new radio station at Wasauksing First Nation.

References

External links
CHRZ 91.3 FM

Hrz
Odawa
Ojibwe culture
Potawatomi
Hrz
Year of establishment missing